The nickname "Razor" Ruddock has been shared by two sportsmen:
  Donovan Ruddock (born 1963), Canadian boxer
  Neil Ruddock (born 1968), English footballer